Margaret, Marchioness of Namur (c. 1194 – Marienthal, 17 July 1270) was ruling Marchioness of Namur, from 1229 to 1237. She was the daughter of Peter of Courtenay (d. 1219), Latin Emperor of Constantinople (1216-1219) and Yolanda of Flanders (d. 1219). By marriage to Henry I, Count of Vianden (d. 1252), she was Countess-consort of Vianden.

Life

Margaret (also called Sybille, in some later sources) married Raoul, Lord of Issoudun c. 1208, who should not be confused with Raoul I of Exoudun (d. 1219). Her husband died c. 1213/5 and Margaret succeeded him as Lady of Châteauneuf-sur-Cher and Mareuil-en-Berry. Soon after that (c. 1216) she married Henry I, Count of Vianden (d. 1252). Henry was the son of Frederic III, Count of Vianden (d. 1217), and his wife Matilda (de). 

In 1216, Margaret′s father Peter Courtenay (d. 1219) was elected Latin Emperor of Constantinople, and crowned in Rome by Pope Honorius III on 9 April 1217. He was succeeded by son Robert of Courtenay (Margaret′s brother) who ruled as Emperor of Constantinople until 1228, when he was succeeded by their brother Baldwin II of Constantinople. Since the elevation to the imperial throne in Constantinople (1216), Margaret′s family became involved in creation of new dynastic policies and alliances.

Marchioness of Namur
Margaret became Marchioness of Namur after the death of her brother Henry II, Marquis of Namur in 1229, who had succeeded another brother, Philip II. Their grandfather had received the county as an inheritance as a nephew of Henry IV, Count of Luxembourg (Henry I of Namur). Margaret and her husband Henry I of Vianden (Henry III of Namur) ruled Namur until 1237, when they had to transfer Namur to Margaret's brother Baldwin II of Courtenay. 

Henry and Margaret continued ruling Vianden. Henry V, Count of Luxembourg (1216 – 1281), maternal grandson of Henry IV, Count of Luxembourg (Henry I of Namur), invaded Namur and ruled it 1256-1264 as Henry IV (or III ?). Baldwin sold Namur in c. 1263 to his cousin Guy of Dampierre, count of Flanders and Henry was removed by military force but they made peace with family marriage.

Later life
After the death of her husband in 1252, Margaret entered a convent in Marienthal near Luxembourg and became a nun. She died in Marienthal on 17 July 1270 and was buried there.

Issue
Margaret and Henry had several children, including:
 Matilda (c. 1220 - a. 1255), married around 1235 to John Angelos of Syrmia (c. 1193 - d. before 1253), Lord of Syrmia. They had a daughter Maria Angelina (c. 1235 - a. 1285) whose husband Anseau de Cayeux (the younger) worked for Charles I of Naples. They also had another daughter, Helena (c. 1236 – 1314), Queen consort of Serbia.
 Peter, dean in cathedrals of Liège and Cologne (died after 1272).
 Frederic of Vianden, who died in 1247 (5 years before his father). He married Matilda of Salm (b. c. 1223), a daughter of Henry III, Count of Ardennes (seigneur de Viviers, c. 1190 - 1246 ?), and had a son named Henry, Lord of Schönecken (1248-1299). 
 Henry I van Vianden (d. 1267), bishop of Utrecht from 1249 to 1267.
 Philip I (d. 1273), Count of Vianden 1252-1273. He married Marie of Brabant-Perwez, daughter of Godfrey of Louvain, Lord of Perwez, apparently a descendant of Godfrey III, Count of Louvain and Landgrave of Brabant (1142-1190). Their issue was Godefroid I, Count of Vianden (d. 1307 or 1310) and four other children.
 Yolanda of Vianden (1231–1283), prioress of Marienthal, still revered today in Luxembourg.

Ancestry

References

Sources

 
 
 
 

1194 births
1270 deaths
Capetian House of Courtenay
Counts of Namur
Counts of Vianden
Countesses of Luxembourg
Vianden
House of Hainaut
House of Metz
House of Flanders
House of Sponheim
Margaret
13th-century women rulers
13th-century French nobility
13th-century French women
13th-century German nobility
13th-century German women